Sakristan is a 2020 Philippine streaming television series starring Clifford Pusing and Henry Villanueva, directed and written by Darryl Yap. A story of two men coming to terms in finding love despite being a church servant. The series was released via Youtube on May 31, 2020.

Plot 
A story of two men settling in discovering love notwithstanding being a congregation worker. Love comes in numerous structures, in numerous countenances, in whatever circumstance you are in. Zach (Clifford Pusing), is ordered by the educational committee to turn into an altar server as a discipline for an offense he submitted. The board accepts this will get him far from regular wicked exercises. The special stepped area workers follow a mate pal framework where the sheep (a term used to allude to amateurs) is collaborated with a senior church youth, called the shepherd. In light of his reputation, Zach is relegated as the sheep of the top of the shepherds, Christian (Henry Villanueva). Zach, albeit a force to be reckoned with tri-competitor, is fizzling in scholastics. In the interim, Christian is an achiever all around — Prom King, Mr. Nourishment Month, Ginoong Agham, Mr. Sportsfest, Campus King, and President of the Altar Servers. What unfolds among Zach and Christian is more trying than a manly relationship, making the story "courageous and freeing", as dir.

Cast 

 Clifford Pusing as Zach
 Henry Villanueva as Christian
 Xavier Reyes as Wolf
 Darrel Rivera as Paps

Production 
On April 13, 2020, Darryl Yap announced that he is currently writing for his upcoming web series called "Sakristan" and it is a boys' Love series. He also said that the web series would have 8 episodes.

Background 
Darryl Yap received widespread criticism before the release of Sakristan due to the nature of the title and posters. There were calls online for Sakristan to be cancelled due to perception that it is disrespectful to the church. They also said that it is a serious offense to the lessons of the Catholic Church/Canon 2357 states that Homosexuality alludes to relations between men or between ladies who experience an elite or transcendent sexual fascination toward people of a similar sex. It has taken an incredible assortment of structures during that time and in various societies. Its mental beginning remains generally unexplained. Putting together itself concerning Sacred Scripture, which presents gay goes about as demonstrations of grave depravity, conventions have consistently pronounced that "homosexual acts are intrinsically disordered." They are in opposition to the regular law. They close the sexual demonstration to the endowment of life. They don't continue from an authentic emotional and sexual complementarity. By no means would they be able to be affirmed. But Darryl Yap said that he had no intention of destroying the image of the church.

Release 
The web series was released on May 31, 2020.

Reception 
As of November 7, 2020

References

External links 

 

Philippine romantic comedy television series
2020s LGBT-related comedy television series
2020s LGBT-related drama television series